The Men's 25 km Open Water event at the 2001 World Aquatics Championships was held on July 21, 2001 in Fukuoka.

Results

Key: DNF = Did not finish, DQ = Disqualified

References

 FINA
 25 km results from Fukuoka

World Aquatics Championships
Open water swimming at the 2001 World Aquatics Championships